Isobel Pooley (born 21 December 1992) is a former British track and field athlete who specialises in the high jump. She won a silver medal at the 2014 Commonwealth Games in Glasgow.

Career
Pooley's first high jump was in the gymnasium at Court Moor School.

As a teenager, Pooley competed at both the World Junior Championships and European Junior Championships, failing to reach the final. In 2012, she improved her best from 1.86m, first to 1.88 m indoors then to 1.90m, which she cleared at the Bedford Games in June. She competed at that year's European Championships in Helsinki, where she was eliminated in the qualifying round with a best of 1.78m. In July 2013, she finished fourth in the final at the European Under 23 Championships in Tampere, clearing 1.90m. A month later, she improved her personal best to 1.91m.

In June 2014 Pooley won the UK Championships with 1.90m. In August she won a silver medal at the Commonwealth Games in Glasgow, with a new best of 1.92m. Three weeks later, she broke the UK outdoor record, when she improved her best by 4 cm to 1.96m in Eberstadt, Germany. The previous UK record of 1.95m had first been set by Diana Davies (then Elliott) in 1982. It was then equalled in 2001 by Susan Moncrieff and again in 2007 by  Olympic Heptathlon Champion Jessica Ennis, before Pooley finally surpassed it. The record was one of the longest standing UK outdoor field event records, with only the women's discus record and the men 800m record which have both stood since 1981, being older.

In 2015 Pooley broke the UK outdoor record, and equalled the indoor record set by Katerina Johnson-Thompson earlier in the year, with 1.97m.

She moved to Germany in November 2017 and announced her retirement in September 2018, at the age of 25.

Pooley graduated from the University of Nottingham in 2014 with first class honours.  In August 2016 she undertook the Macmillan "Brave the Shave" charity challenge by having her head shaved.

International competitions

Note: Results with a q, indicate overall position in qualifying round.

National titles

English Schools Championships - 2009, 2010
England Under 20 Championships - 2010, 2011
England Under 23 Championships - 2013
UK Championships & trials - 2014, 2015

References

1992 births
Living people
Athletes from London
English female high jumpers
British female high jumpers
Commonwealth Games silver medallists for England
Commonwealth Games medallists in athletics
Athletes (track and field) at the 2014 Commonwealth Games
World Athletics Championships athletes for Great Britain
British Athletics Championships winners
Medallists at the 2014 Commonwealth Games